The 2019–20 Iraq FA Cup was the 30th edition of the Iraqi knockout football cup as a clubs-only competition, the main domestic cup in Iraqi football, featuring a total of 20 teams from the Iraqi Premier League and 48 teams from the Iraq Division One and Iraq Division Two. The tournament started on 12 September 2019, but was cancelled during the Round of 32 because of the COVID-19 pandemic.

Format

Participation 
The cup started with the first round, consisting of 48 teams from the Iraq Division One and Iraq Division Two, followed by the second round, consisting of the 24 qualified teams. The 20 Iraqi Premier League clubs joined the 12 qualified teams to form the Round of 32.

Cards 
If a player received a second yellow card, they were banned from the next cup match. If a player received a red card, they were banned for a minimum of one match, but more could be added by the Iraq Football Association.

Participating clubs 
The following 68 teams were participating in the competition:

Bold: indicated teams are still in competition

Schedule 
The rounds of the 2019–20 competition were scheduled as follows:

First round 
48 teams from the Division One and Division Two competed in this round.

Second round

Final phase

Bracket

Round of 32 
20 top-tier teams and 12 lower-tier teams were set to compete in this round.

References

External links
 Iraq Football Association

 
Iraq
Cup
Iraq FA Cup